The 173d Air Refueling Squadron (173d ARS) is a unit of the Nebraska Air National Guard 155th Air Refueling Wing. It is assigned to Lincoln Air National Guard Base, Nebraska and is equipped with the Boeing KC-135 Stratotanker.

History

World War II
 see 401st Fighter Squadron for full World War II history

The 401st Fighter Squadron was established on 22 July 1943 at Westover Field, Massachusetts and equipped with P-47 Thunderbolts. Deployed to the European Theater of Operations (ETO) and assigned to Ninth Air Force in England, it engaged in combat operations until May 1945. It returned to the United States during September–November 1945, and was inactivated on 7 November 1945.

Nebraska Air National Guard
The unit was allotted to the National Guard on 24 May 1946 and redesignated the 173rd Fighter Squadron, and was further allotted to the Nebraska Air National Guard. It was organized and federally recognized as a P-51D Mustang squadron in July 1946. It was the second Air National Guard unit established, and assigned to the Iowa ANG 132d Fighter Group.  It was posted to Lincoln Airport (later Lincoln Air Force Base), a former Second Air Force training field during World War II. With the long runways of the airport, the unit upgraded to Lockheed P-80A Shooting Star jet aircraft in early 1948.  In 1950 the unit became the first Air National Guard organization to win the Winston P. Wilson Trophy as the outstanding jet fighter unit. It was the first of five Wilson trophies to be awarded to the Nebraska organization.

Activated to federal service during the Korean War, the unit was sent to Dow AFB, Maine. Used by TAC to train replacement pilots in F-51D Mustang ground support operations, it also deployed unit members to Japan and Korea to fly combat missions.  The 132d was moved to Alexandria AFB, Louisiana in May 1952 again with F-51s replacing the federalized Oklahoma ANG 137th Fighter-Bomber Wing which was deployed to France. The unit performed training as a tactical fighter unit until relieved from active service and returned to Nebraska ANG jurisdiction in January 1953.

Upon returning to Lincoln, the squadron was forced to share facilities with the new Strategic Air Command provisional 4120th Air Base Group and extensive construction enlarging the airport to support SAC bombers as Lincoln Air Force Base. In late 1953, the unit re-equipped with more-advanced F-80C Shooting Star jets and the 173d was re-designated as a Fighter-Interceptor squadron, with the Air Defense Command (ADC) becoming the gaining organization.  Its new mission was the air defense of Nebraska and specifically the air defense of the new SAC facility, which was programmed to receive the Air Forces new B-47 Stratojet intercontinental jet bomber in 1954.

In 1955 the 173d was authorized new facilities. A new site was located south of the commercial air terminal adjoining the Air Force base and the unit moved to its new facilities in the fall of 1956. Two years later, the unit moved into a vacated Naval Air Reserve hangar and turned its "old" hangar over to the Nebraska Army National Guard. Since that time, additional facilities were built on the 166 acres (0.67 km2) of the Lincoln Air National Guard Base. Army aviation and other Army units remain tenants today.

The 173d transitioned to North American F-86D Sabre interceptors in 1957, and upgraded to the modified F-86L in 1959 which could be computer controlled by the ground-based SAGE guidance system to intercept target unknown aircraft.  In 1960, ADC decided to expand the organization to a group level, activating the 155th Fighter-Interceptor Group at Lincoln AFB on 1 July; with jurisdiction of the 173d being transferred from the Iowa ANG 132d Fighter Group to the new 155th FIG.

The unit remained under ADC until 1964 with the planned retirement of the B-47.   The unit then received Republic RF-84F Thunderflash photo-reconnaissance aircraft and became a Tactical Air Command reconnaissance squadron. In January 1965 SAC's 307th Bomb Wing began phasing down at Lincoln AFB and the base was closed on 6 June 1966; returning it to its original role of a municipal airport with a collocated Air National Guard Base.

The 173d continued to operate as a tactical reconnaissance squadron until 1993, being upgraded to the RF-4C Phantom II in 1972.   With the retirement of the Phantom in the early 1990s and the end of the Cold War, the unit was re-aligned into the 173d Air Refueling Squadron, flying Boeing KC-135R Stratotankers and being activated to federal service under the Air Mobility Command.

Lineage

 Constituted 401st Fighter Squadron on 22 July 1943
 Activated on 25 July 1943
 Inactivated on 10 November 1945
 Re-designated 173d Fighter Squadron and allocated to the Nebraska Air National Guard on 24 May 1946.
 173rd Fighter Squadron (Single-Engine) extended federal recognition on 26 July 1946
 Re-designated: 173d Fighter Squadron (Jet) in Spring 1948
 Ordered into active service on 1 April 1951
 Relieved from active duty and returned to Nebraska ANG, on 1 January 1953
 Re-designated: 173d Fighter-Bomber Squadron on 1 January 1953
 Re-designated: 173d Fighter-Interceptor Squadron in Fall 1953
 Re-designated: 173d Tactical Reconnaissance Squadron on 1 May 1964
 Re-designated: 173d Reconnaissance Squadron on 15 March 1992
 Re-designated: 173d Air Refueling Squadron on 1 October 1995

Assignments
 370th Fighter Group, 25 July 1943 – 7 November 1945
 132d Fighter Group, 26 July 1946
 132d Fighter-Bomber Group, on 1 January 1953
 132d Fighter-Interceptor Group, 1 July 1958
 155th Fighter-Interceptor Group, 1 July 1960
 155th Tactical Reconnaissance Group, 1 May 1964
 155th Reconnaissance Group, 15 March 1992
 155th Air Refueling Group, 1 January 1994
 155th Air Refueling Wing, 1 Oct 1995–present

Stations

 Westover Field, Massachusetts, 1 July 1943
 Groton AAFld, Connecticut, 19 October 1943
 Bradley Field, Connecticut, 5–20 January 1944
 RAF Aldermaston (AAF-467), England, 12 February 1944 467
 RAF Andover (AAF-406), England, 29 February – 19 July 1944 406
 Cardonville Airfield (A-3), France, 24 July 1944
 La Vieille Airfield (A-19), France, 15 August 1944
 Lonray Airfield (A-45), France, 6 September 1944
 Roye-Amy Airfield (A-73), France, 11 September 1944
 Florennes/Juzaine Airfield (A-78), Belgium 26 September 1944

 Ophoven Airfield (Y-32), Belgium 27 January 1945
 Gütersloh Airfield (Y-99), Germany 20 April 1945
 AAF Station Mannheim/Sandhofen, Germany. 27 June 1945
 AAF Station Fritzlar, Germany, 6 August–September 1945
 Camp Miles Standish, Massachusetts, 6–7 November 1945
 Lincoln Army Airfield (later, AFB, Air National Guard Base), Nebraska, 26 July 1946 – Present
 Operated from: Dow AFB, Maine, Spring, 1 April 1951 – 5 November 1952
 Operated from: Alexandria AFB, Louisiana, 5 November 1952 – 1 January 1953

Aircraft

 P-38 Lightning, 1943–1945
 P-51D Mustang, 1945
 F-51D Mustang, 1946–1948, 1951–1953
 F-80C Shooting Star, 1948–1951, 1953–1957
 F-86D Sabre Interceptor, 1957–1959

 F-86L Sabre Interceptor, 1959–1964
 RF-84F Thunderstreak, 1964–1972
 RF-4C Phantom II, 1972–1993
 KC-135R Stratotanker, 1993–Present

References

 
 173d Air Refueling Squadron Lineage and History
 Rogers, B. (2006). United States Air Force Unit Designations Since 1978. 
  Cornett, Lloyd H. and Johnson, Mildred W., A Handbook of Aerospace Defense Organization  1946–1980, Office of History, Aerospace Defense Center, Peterson AFB, CO (1980).
 155th Air Refueling Wing@globalsecurity.org
 History of the Nebraska Air National Guard

External links

Squadrons of the United States Air National Guard
Military units and formations in Nebraska
Air refueling squadrons of the United States Air Force